Sandy Run is a second-order stream (according to the Strahler stream order) that is a tributary to the Wissahickon Creek at Fort Washington State Park. The stream follows through Abington, Upper Dublin, Springfield, and Whitemarsh Townships; and flows through several golf courses, including Sandy Run Country Club, Lu Lu Country Club, and Manufacturers Country Club. This creek can be fished in some places, mainly between Manufacturer's Country Club and the Wissahickon Creek. Fish that inhabit this creek include Sunfish, Carp, Smallmouth and Largemouth Bass, Catfish, and several other species.

Tributaries
No named tributaries

See also
List of rivers of Pennsylvania

References

 Ambler 7.5 Minute Quadrangle, Department of the Interior, USGS.

Rivers of Pennsylvania
Tributaries of the Schuylkill River
Upper Dublin Township, Montgomery County, Pennsylvania
Rivers of Montgomery County, Pennsylvania